Café Buono! is the first album from the J-pop idol group, Buono! released on February 20, 2008. The standard album comes with a Buono! photocard while the limited edition, first press version includes a different photocard and a DVD.

Track listing

CD 
 "Café Buono!"
 
 
 
 
 
 "Internet Cupid"
 "Last Forever"

Limited edition DVD

Oricon ranks and sales

References

External links 
 Café Buono! entry on the Pony Canyon official website
 Café Buono! entry on the Hello! Project official website

2008 debut albums
Buono! albums
Pony Canyon albums